Blue Valley Southwest High School is a fully accredited public high school located in Overland Park, Kansas, United States, and one of five currently operated high schools in the Blue Valley USD 229 school district. The school opened in August 2010. The principal is Scott Roberts. Its feeder school is Aubry Bend Middle School. In total, Blue Valley Southwest is a  facility.  The school mascot is the Timberwolf and the school colors are forest green, black, and silver.

Facilities
Blue Valley Southwest is sited on a  plot. The design of the building is organized around a courtyard, with all common spaces: theater lobby, administration, cafeteria, library, and cyber cafe opening directly onto this central space. The courtyard allows students an easy connection to the outdoors, while keeping them safe and secure. Recognizing that students tend to gather in small groups, the sloping courtyard permits several distinct zones: an amphitheater, breakout patio for the theater patrons, open green space, and seating terraces for the library and cafeteria.

The academic area has been organized into four small learning communities. These spaces are designed to move easily between a variety of curricular models: grade level houses, academic departments, or interdisciplinary academies. At the heart of the academic zone is the media center and a distributed administrative suite. The outstretched wings of the academic communities are linked to the library and administrative zone by Flexible Teaching and Learning Areas which allow larger, more flexible teaching spaces for special projects and informal common space.

The new school incorporates many eco-friendly design ideas. Central to this effort is a below floor, quiet, displaced air delivery system which allows improved indoor air quality and thermal comfort while using less energy to deliver conditioned air. The building features a good deal of natural day lighting, with borrow lights throughout the interior, indirect lighting with higher ceilings, and daylight sensors. The building has highly reflective roofing materials and locally produced materials such as Kansas brick and limestone. The school was sited with careful attention to solar orientation to minimize heat gain yet maximize views. An existing pond was enhanced to collect storm water run-off and provide water for irrigation of the surrounding landscape.

Extracurricular activities

Athletics
Blue Valley Southwest is a member of the Kansas State High School Activities Association and competes in the Eastern Kansas League. Blue Valley Southwest teams compete at the 5A level.

State Championships

See also
 List of high schools in Kansas
 List of unified school districts in Kansas
Other high schools in Blue Valley USD 229 school district
 Blue Valley High School in Stilwell
 Blue Valley North High School in Overland Park
 Blue Valley Northwest High School in Overland Park
 Blue Valley West High School in Overland Park
 Blue Valley Academy in Overland Park

References

External links
 School Website
 Blue Valley USD 229 school district
 District School Boundary Map

Public high schools in Kansas
Schools in Johnson County, Kansas
2010 establishments in Kansas